Juan Manuel Alejándrez Rodríguez (May 17, 1944 – January 6, 2007) was a Mexican football defender. He played for the Mexico national team between 1967 and 1970, including the World Cup on home soil in 1970.

External links
 
 
 

1944 births
2007 deaths
Footballers from Jalisco
Association football defenders
Mexico international footballers
Olympic footballers of Mexico
Footballers at the 1968 Summer Olympics
1970 FIFA World Cup players
Pan American Games medalists in football
Pan American Games gold medalists for Mexico
Cruz Azul footballers
CD Oro footballers
Atlante F.C. footballers
Liga MX players
Footballers at the 1967 Pan American Games
Medalists at the 1967 Pan American Games
Mexican footballers